Erika Arnoldine Cornelia Thijs (16 May 1960 – 4 August 2011) was a Flemish politician and member of the Christian Democratic and Flemish party.

Thijs was born in Hasselt.  From 1988, she was a member of the Municipal Council of Bilzen, and, from 1995, she was a Senator directly elected by the Dutch language electoral college.

External links
 Official site - (Only available in Dutch)

1960 births
2011 deaths
Christian Democratic and Flemish politicians
People from Hasselt
21st-century Belgian politicians
21st-century Belgian women politicians